The 2018–19 Turkish Women's Volleyball League is the 36th edition of the top-flight professional women's volleyball league in Turkey.

League table

Results

Head-to-Head results

Statistics

League stage

Play-Off Stage

Results

Week 1

|}

Week 2

|}

Week 3

|}

Week 4

|}

Week 5

|}

Week 6

|}

Week 7

|}

Week 8

|}

Week 9

|}

Week 10

|}

Week 11

|}

Week 12

|}

Week 13

|}

Week 14

|}

Week 15

|}

Week 16

|}

Week 17

|}

Week 18

|}

Week 19

|}

Week 20

|}

Week 21

|}

Week 22

|}

Play-outs

Play-offs
The eight teams that finished in the places 1 to 8 in the Regular season, compete in the Play-off (1-8).

Quarterfinals

Fifth place play-offs
 Winners qualify for CEV Challenge Cup main phase.
 2 matches were needed for win.

Semifinals
 Winners qualify for CEV Champions League league round.

Seventh place matches

Fifth place matches

Third place matches
 Winner qualify for CEV Champions League qualification round.
 Loser qualify for CEV Cup main phase.

Final matches 
 5 matches were needed for win.

Final standing

Awards

Regular season 

Best Scorer
 Olesia Rykhliuk (Beşiktaş)
Best Setter
  Ezgi Dilik (Eczacıbaşı VitrA)
Best Outside Spikers
  Anne Buijs (Nilüfer Belediyespor)
   Jana Kulan (Kameroğlu Beylikdüzü Vol. İht.)

Best Middle Blockers
  Yasemin Güveli (Eczacıbaşı VitrA)
  Ana Carolina da Silva (Nilüfer Belediyespor)
Best Opposite Spiker
   Tijana Bošković (Eczacıbaşı VitrA)
Best Libero
  Pinar Eren (Beşiktaş)

Finals Series

 MVP
  Zhu Ting (VakıfBank)
 Best Spiker
  Gözde Kırdar (VakıfBank)
 Best Blocker
  Beyza Arıcı (Eczacıbaşı VitrA}

 Best Setter
  Cansu Özbay (VakıfBank)
 Best Libero
  Gizem Örge (VakıfBank)
 Special Award
  Zehra Gunes (VakıfBank)

External links
 2017–18 Vestel Venus Sultanlar Ligi 

Turkey
Turkish Volleyball League
Turkish Volleyball League
2018 in Turkish women's sport
2019 in Turkish women's sport
Turkish Women's Volleyball League seasons